Peter Gotthardt (born 22 August 1941) is a German composer, musician and publisher. Film melodies composed by him (more than 500 in total) are known to a wide audience, including major successes such as the pieces Wenn ein Mensch lebt and  performed by the Puhdys from the 1973 DEFA feature film The Legend of Paul and Paula, directed by Heiner Carow.

Life 
Born in Leipzig, from 1961 to 1966, Gotthardt studied piano, correpetition, conducting and composing at the Hochschule für Musik "Hanns Eisler" in Berlin. A year later, he wrote his first orchestral work. In 1968, he began his first collaboration with Heiner Carow for the DEFA film The Russians Are Coming, which resulted in five joint films in the following years. From 1975 to 1976, he was also head of incidental music at the Rostock Volkstheater.

He has worked as a freelance composer since 1976. In 1991, he founded his own music publishing company and has subsequently also written various compositions for industrial films.

Gotthardt has lived in Berlin-Mahlsdorf since 1975.

Awards 
 1990: Ernst Reuter Prize für Originalton-Hörspiel Ich schlage vor, den Beifall kurz zu halten
 2018: Ehrenpreis des Deutscher Filmmusikpreis für sein Lebenswerk

Recording 
 Lovedreams. Filmmusiken von Peter Gotthardt. VEB Deutsche Schallplatten Berlin/Amiga 856 270, 1987

Film scores 

 1958: Sandmännchen (TV)
 1965: Studentinnen – Eindrücke von einer Hochschule
 1967: Der tapfere Schulschwänzer
 1968: Mit beiden Beinen im Himmel – Begegnung mit einem Flugkapitän
 1971: Die Russen kommen
 1971: Albrecht Dürer 1471 – 1528
 1971: Karriere
 1972: Einberufen
 1973: Der kleine Kommandeur
 1973: Ich bin ein Junger Pionier
 1973: Die Legende von Paul und Paula
 1974: Polizeiruf 110: Per Anhalter (TV series)
 1974: Polizeiruf 110: Kein Paradies für Elstern (TV series)
 1974: Liebe mit 16
 1974: Kriminalfälle ohne Beispiel: Nach Abpfiff Mord (TV series)
 1974: … verdammt, ich bin erwachsen
 1974: Polizeiruf 110: Der Tod des Professors (TV series)
 1975: Blumen für den Mann im Mond
 1975: Polizeiruf 110: Die Rechnung geht nicht auf (TV series)
 1976: Auf der Suche nach Gatt (TV)
 1976: Ohne Märchen wird keiner groß (TV)
 1976: Polizeiruf 110: Reklamierte Rosen (TV- series)
 1976: Die Lindstedts (TV series)
 1977: Berliner in Pankow
 1977: Gut gemeinter Zuruf oder Das Kleefest
 1977: Ikarus
 1977: Heimweh nach Rügen oder Gestern noch war ich Köchin
 1977: Die Verführbaren (TV)
 1977: Trampen nach Norden
 1978: Brandstellen
 1978: Sieben Sommersprossen
 1978: Das Tal von Hadramaut
 1978: Hummelflug
 1979: Hier wo ich lebe
 1979: Kennst du das Land… Eine politische Revue (Dok.-film)
 1979: Bis daß der Tod euch scheidet
 1979: Schneeweißchen und Rosenrot
 1979: Der Garten Eden
 1980: Die Matrosen von Cattaro(Kotorski mornari)
 1980: Solo für Martina (TV)
 1981: Adel im Untergang (TV)
 1981: Liebster Dziodzio (Dokumentarfilm)
 1981: Trompeten-Anton (TV)
 1982: Polizeiruf 110: Petra (TV series)
 1982: Polizeiruf 110: Im Tal (TV series)
 1982: Das Mädchen und der Junge (TV)
 1983: Seiten einer Chronik (TV)
 1983: Angelika aus Mexiko
 1983: Insel der Schwäne
 1984: Nachhilfe für Vati (1984) (TV)
 1984: Flieger (TV)
 1984: Die Witwe Capet (TV)
 1984: Rublak – Die Legende vom vermessenen Land
 1984: Überfahrt (TV)
 1984: Wo andere schweigen
 1984: Ich liebe Victor (TV)
 1984: Polizeiruf 110: Schwere Jahre (1st part) (TV series)
 1984: Polizeiruf 110: Schwere Jahre (2nd part) (TV series)
 1985: Das gestohlene Gesicht
 1985: Polizeiruf 110: Ein Schritt zu weit (TV series)
 1986: Der Staatsanwalt hat das Wort: Ein todsicherer Tip (TV series)
 1986: Schauspielereien: Berührungspunkte (TV series)
 1986: Mönch ärgere dich nicht (TV)
 1986: Schauspielereien: Zimmer 418 (TV series)
 1987: Käthe Kollwitz – Bilder eines Lebens
 1987: Mensch, Hermann! (TV series)
 1987: Einzug ins Paradies (TV serie, 6 episodes)
 1987: Jan Oppen (TV)
 1987: Der Staatsanwalt hat das Wort: Ich werde dich nie verraten (TV-Reihe series
 1988: Gabriel komm zurück (TV)
 1988: Thomas Müntzer
 1988: Der Staatsanwalt hat das Wort: Da mach’ ich nicht mit (TV series)
 1988: Lieb Georg (TV)
 1988: Der Staatsanwalt hat das Wort: Wo mich keiner kennt (TV series)
 1989: Polizeiruf 110: Mitternachtsfall (TV series)
 1989: Schauspielereien: Auf den zweiten Blick (TV series)
 1989: Der Staatsanwalt hat das Wort: Blaue Taube soll fliegen (TV series)
 1990: Der Staatsanwalt hat das Wort: Hallo Partner (TV series)
 1997: Der Hauptmann von Köpenick (TV)
 2003: Ewige Schönheit
 2005: Die Hitlerkantate
 2008: Kategorie C – Der Film

Radio play music 
 1988: Thomas Rosenlöcher: Das Gänseblümchen – direction:  (Children's radio play – Rundfunk der DDR)
 1992: Clemens Brentano:  und dem Müller Radlauf – direction Peter Groeger (Children's radio play – DS Kultur)
 1993: Adam Bodor: Die Außenstelle – direction: Peter Groeger (radio play – MDR/ORF)

Further reading 
 H. P. Hofmann: Beat Lexikon. Interpreten, Autoren, Sachbegriffe.  Musikverlag, Berlin (Ost), 1977.
 Wolfgang Thiel: Jenseits von PAUL UND PAULA oder: Auf der Suche nach einem filmgemäßen Klang. Anmerkungen zu Peter Gotthardts Kompositionen für Film und Fernsehen. In Filmblatt 18. Jg., Nr. 52 Spring 2013,  .
 Rosa Marie Blunt: Mitunter fällt mir etwas ein… Eine dokumentierende Sammlung zum 70. Geburtstag des Komponisten Peter Michael Gotthardt. Gedichte, Lyrics und Sentenzen von Peter Michael Gotthardt, APHAIA VERLAG, 2011, .

References

External links 
 
 
 Peter Gotthardt on Filmportal
 

German film score composers
1941 births
Living people
Musicians from Leipzig